NGC 222 is an open cluster located approximately 210,000 light-years from the Sun in the Small Magellanic Cloud. It is located in the constellation Tucana. It was discovered on August 1, 1826 by James Dunlop.

See also 
 List of NGC objects (1–1000)

References

External links 
 
 SEDS

0222
Open clusters
Tucana (constellation)
Small Magellanic Cloud
Astronomical objects discovered in 1826